Gustavo Marcos Herrero  (born 23 December 1972) is a Spanish male water polo player in the late '90s and early '00s. He was a member of the Spain men's national water polo team, playing as a centre back. He was a part of the  team at the 2000 Summer Olympics and 2004 Summer Olympics. On club level he played for CN Sabadell in Spain.

See also
 List of world champions in men's water polo
 List of World Aquatics Championships medalists in water polo

References

External links
 

1972 births
Living people
Spanish male water polo players
Water polo players at the 2004 Summer Olympics
Olympic water polo players of Spain
People from Barcelona
Water polo players at the 2000 Summer Olympics
21st-century Spanish people